Italy participated in and won the Eurovision Song Contest 2021. Italian broadcaster RAI announced in October 2020 that the winning performer(s) of the Sanremo Music Festival 2021, later turning out to be Måneskin with "", would earn the right to represent the nation at the Eurovision Song Contest in Rotterdam, the Netherlands. Måneskin eventually became the sixty-eighth winner of the Eurovision Song Contest and the first Italian entry to win the contest in 31 years. Italy received a total of 524 points, winning the public vote with 318 points and coming at fourth place in the jury vote with 206 points.

Background 

Prior to the 2021 contest, Italy had participated in the Eurovision Song Contest forty-five times since its first entry during the inaugural contest in 1956. Since then, Italy has won the contest on two occasions: in 1964 with the song "" performed by Gigliola Cinquetti and in 1990 with the song "" performed by Toto Cutugno. Italy has withdrawn from the Eurovision Song Contest a number of times with their most recent absence spanning from 1998 until 2010. Their return in 2011 with the song "Madness of Love", performed by Raphael Gualazzi, placed second—their highest result, to this point, since their victory in 1990. In the 2019 edition, Mahmood represented Italy with the song "", placing second with 472 points. In 2020, Diodato was set to represent the nation with the song "" before the contest's cancellation.

Between 2011 and 2013, the broadcaster used the Sanremo Music Festival as an artist selection pool where a special committee would select one of the competing artist, independent of the results in the competition, as the Eurovision entrant. The selected entrant was then responsible for selecting the song they would compete with. For 2014, RAI forwent using the Sanremo Music Festival artist lineup and internally selected their entry. Since 2015, the winning artist of the Sanremo Music Festival is rewarded with the opportunity to represent Italy at the Eurovision Song Contest, although in 2016 the winner declined and the broadcaster appointed the runner-up as the Italian entrant.

Before Eurovision

Artist selection

Italian broadcaster RAI confirmed that the performer that would represent Italy at the 2021 Eurovision Song Contest would be selected from the competing artists at the Sanremo Music Festival 2021. According to the rules of Sanremo 2021, the winner of the festival earns the right to represent Italy at the Eurovision Song Contest, but in case the artist is not available or refuses the offer, the organisers of the event reserve the right to choose another participant via their own criteria. The competition took place between 2 and 6 March 2021 with the winner being selected on the last day of the festival.

Twenty-six artists competed in Sanremo 2021. Among the competing artists were former Eurovision Song Contest entrants Francesca Michielin and Ermal Meta, who represented Italy in 2016 and 2018 respectively. Additionally, Noemi and Francesca Michielin and Fedez's songs were co-written by Mahmood, who represented Italy in 2019. The performers were:

Final 
The 26 Big Artists each performed their entry again for a final time on 6 March 2021. A combination of public televoting (25%), press jury voting (25%), demoscopic jury voting (25%) and Sanremo Orchestra (25%) selected the top three to face a superfinal vote, then the winner of Sanremo 2021 was decided by a combination of public televoting (34%), demoscopic jury voting (33%) and press jury voting (33%). Måneskin were declared the winners of the contest with the song "Zitti e buoni".

At Eurovision 

The Eurovision Song Contest 2021 took place at Rotterdam Ahoy in Rotterdam, Netherlands and consisted of two semi-finals on 18 and 20 May and the final on 22 May 2021. According to Eurovision rules, all nations with the exceptions of the host country and the "Big Five" (France, Germany, Italy, Spain and the United Kingdom) are required to qualify from one of two semi-finals in order to compete for the final; the top ten countries from each semi-final progress to the final. As a member of the "Big Five", Italy automatically qualified to compete in the final. In addition to their participation in the final, Italy was also required to broadcast and vote in one of the two semi-finals.

Italy performed 24th in the grand final on 22 May 2021, following the Netherlands and preceding Sweden. To conform with European Broadcasting Union (EBU) rules governing the use of explicit language, several changes were made to the lyrics of "" as performed by Måneskin at the Sanremo Music Festival earlier in the year. However, when the band reprised the song as winners at the end of the competition, these alterations were reversed.

Voting 
Voting during the three shows involved each country awarding two sets of points from 1-8, 10 and 12: one from their professional jury and the other from televoting. Each nation's jury consisted of five music industry professionals who are citizens of the country they represent, with a diversity in gender and age represented. The judges assess each entry based on the performances during the second Dress Rehearsal of each show, which takes place the night before each live show, against a set of criteria including: vocal capacity; the stage performance; the song's composition and originality; and the overall impression by the act. Jury members may only take part in panel once every three years, and are obliged to confirm that they are not connected to any of the participating acts in a way that would impact their ability to vote impartially. Jury members should also vote independently, with no discussion of their vote permitted with other jury members. The exact composition of the professional jury, and the results of each country's jury and televoting were released after the grand final; the individual results from each jury member were also released in an anonymised form.

Points awarded to Italy

Points awarded by Italy

Detailed voting results 
The following members comprised the Italian jury:
 Giusy Cascio
 Emanuele Lombardini
 Stefano Mannucci
 Gregorio Matteo (jury member in the final)
 Katia Riccardi
 Simone Pinelli (jury member in semi-final 1)

References

2021
Countries in the Eurovision Song Contest 2021
Eurovision